CoRoT-24b is a transiting exoplanet found by the CoRoT space telescope in 2011 and announced in 2014. Along with CoRoT-24c, it is one of two exoplanets orbiting CoRoT-24, making it the first multiple transiting system detected by the telescope. It is a hot Neptune orbiting at a distance of 0.056 AU from its host star.

Properties
CoRoT-24b and CoRoT-24c are similar in size; however, CoRoT-24b is more than four times less massive, indicating its low density. Dr. Lammer's team modelled the planetary system and found that the atmosphere should have already evaporated a long time ago. This led to the conclusion that CoRoT-24b is not as big as previously thought, being perhaps 30 to 60 percent smaller than initially measured.

References

Transiting exoplanets
Exoplanets discovered in 2011
23b